The DY Patil Stadium, (also known as DY Patil Sports Stadium), is a multi-purpose sports arena in Navi Mumbai, Maharashtra. 

It is owned by Marathi politician Dnyandeo Yashwantrao Patil . It is based in the D.Y. Patil Sports Academy in Nerul. Primarily a cricket stadium, it is, however, sometimes used for football, music concerts and other events.

It was inaugurated on 4 March 2008, was used as the home ground for Indian Premier League (IPL) franchise Mumbai Indians (MI). It has hosted the inuagral season's final in 2008 and 2010 season final. In 2022 season the arena hosted number of games.

The stadium has also hosted football matches during the 2017 FIFA U-17 World Cup, 2022 FIFA U-17 Women's World Cup and 2022 AFC Women's Asian Cup.

In 2014, it was announced that the stadium will be the home ground of the Indian Super League club Mumbai City FC. It has also hosted the Final of Hero ISL 2014 between Atlético de Kolkata and Kerala Blasters FC.

The capacity of 55,000 makes it the ninth-largest cricket stadium in India. The stadium makes use of bucket seats and cantilever roofs that eliminate the need for columns.
This provides the spectators with an unobstructed view of the match from any place within the stands. On the other hand, the stadium has a 120-person capacity air-conditioned media center. The upper level of the viewing galleries has 60 private corporate boxes.This stadium also holds an inter-school cricket match for DY Patil International school every year.

The arena is hosting games of the Women's Premier League (WPL) since 4 March 2023. It has hosted the opening game-ceremony and scheduled to host final match.

History

IPL 
The Indian Premier League has used DY Patil Stadium as a host venue since 2008. Many teams have used the stadium pitch, university oval and nursery ground training facilities for squad training.

Football 

FIFA U-17 World Cup 

The stadium underwent INR 30 crores worth of refurbishment, including changing the roof, building 16 emergency exit bridges, two additional dressing rooms, and setting up four training grounds in the vicinity for FIFA U-17 World cup.

A 500 KW solar plant was installed to take care of more than 70 percent of the electrical requirements of the stadium as an initiative to minimize the unfavorable environmental effect of the stadium.

The tournament kicked off on 6 October with a New Zealand v/s Turkey match which was a stalemate, followed by Paraguay v/s Mali with 5 total goals scored and Paraguay edging out as the winner with the final score being 3–2. The second matchday (9 October) witnessed matches between Turkey and Mali followed by a match between Paraguay and New Zealand which saw a 4-2 scoreline. Paraguay followed this up with another magnificent performance on 12 October, cementing their round of 16 berths by topping group B. Ensuring that was the most anticipated match, USA vs. Colombia, which finished with Colombia registering a 3–1 win over the US in a hard-fought match that saw both teams qualify for the round of 16 from group A.

The round of 16 matches on 18 October saw Ghana beat Niger 2-0 leading the Black Starlets to the quarter-finals.
 
In this world cup semi-final was the last game hosted by this arena, in that game Mali played against Spain. 37,847 spectators showed up for this match.

Indian Super League 2014 

DY Patil Stadium served as the home ground for Mumbai City FC in the inaugural season of the Indian Super League (ISL). Players like Freddie Ljungberg and Nicolas Anelka had graced the stadium while playing for Mumbai City FC. The final of the tournament was hosted at DY Patil Stadium, with Atletico de Kolkata beating Kerala Blasters.

ISL 2015 
DY Patil Stadium served as the home ground for Mumbai City FC for the second season running. Sunil Chettri was signed by Mumbai City FC for a record-breaking deal and played most of the home games at the stadium. The most notable memory at the stadium was when Chettri scored a hat-trick against NorthEast United FC.

Local tournaments
Times Shield

Mumbai Cricket Association (MCA) Times Shield matches are played at DY Patil, on both the main stadium pitch and university oval.
Also, the Dr. DY Patil Sports Academy (DYPSA) organized India's first official T20 tournament in 2005. The tournament is hosted annually at the stadium and includes:

 D.Y. Patil 'A' 
 D.Y. Patil 'B'
 Mumbai Customs
 Jain Irrigation 
 Indian Oil
 Central Railway
 Income Tax
 BPCL
 Reliance 1
 CAG
 Indian Navy
 Bank of Baroda
 Canara Bank
 Air India
 RBI
 Western Railway

The DY Patil T20 Tournament typically runs between February and April and is a breeding ground for young talented stars in India as well as highly experienced cricketers.

Road Safety World Series

The Road Safety World Series international T20 tournament was held at the DY Patil stadium, before Covid-19 impacted the tournament in 2020 resulting in the games moving to Raipur, India. 
Events
On 4 December 2019, the 98th Birthday celebrations of Pramukh Swami Maharaj, with a gathering of more than 90000 devotees, were held. Home Minister of India - Amit Shah, Former CM & leader of opposition in Maharashtra Devendra Fadnavis, Dilip Joshi were also present.

List of International Matches Played

ODI

The 7th ODI between India and Australia during Australia's 2009 tour of India was to be played on 11 November 2009. It was supposed to be the first international cricket match to take place here, but got cancelled due to heavy rain.It finally hosted its first international match on 9 December 2022, when Indian women's cricket team played against visiting Australian women's team. In that series, two games were held here.

T20

The arena hosted the matches and final of inuagral season of 2008 IPL. In IPL 2010 it hosted 6 games including the opening match, the semi-finals, the 3rd place playoff and the final.

Football

It has hosted Football matches of Indian Super League for the club Mumbai City FC, and hosted the  first-ever ISL Final in 2014. The stadium also hosted matches of the 2017 FIFA U-17 World Cup, 2022 FIFA U-17 Women's World Cup and the 2022 Women's Asian Cup.

Infrastructure

Roof

The stadium roof is made from fabric imported from Germany.

Lighting
There are diesel generators that have been installed to guard against interrupted power supply during games. These lights were upgraded for the 2022 IPL to replace filament lights with LED for increased lux rating with lower energy consumption.

Pitch and outfield

For the ground, 200 tons of clay were imported from South Africa. The pitch was prepared based on the advice and guidance of Neil Tainton and John Klug from South Africa. Stadiums around India typically have outfields made from red soil. When it rains, the outfield tends to become sluggish and heavy. To minimise the interruption because of rain, the outfield here is sand-based. A completely concealed underground drainage system helps quickly remove water. A practise ground with 10 practice pitches is also on the campus next to the main stadium.

Spectator comfort and safety
Individual bucket seats are available to spectators. There are no pillars obstructing the views of the ground. Two giant LED screens provide scores, replays, and other information. 

Spectators are monitored by a network of digital cameras producing images of very high quality, which are sent to security agencies. Axis cameras (the product of a Sweden-based company), like the ones installed in Mons-Bergen football stadium in Belgium, have been installed for the first time in India. The surveillance system is highly advanced when compared to conventional CCTVs. The stadium is designed to be earthquake-proof, with fire-fighting and evacuation facilities.

Transport Access 
Closest local train station – Nerul station

Other accessible local train station – Juinagar railway stationJuinagar

Bus routes

Other modes of transport include ac and non-ac cabs and rickshaws.

Parking is available at the stadium as well as DY Patil University.

Facilities

There are 2 full cricket grounds (Stadium Pitch and University Oval), 1 additional training ground (The Nursery Grounds) which is also a full size and FIFA accredited football pitch, a netting and training area, fully operational Gym and Sports Centre, and a restaurant (under construction)

There are luxury suites with attached restrooms. Catering support is provided in the main pavilion area. There are 60 corporate boxes on the upper level of the viewing galleries.

Music Concerts
Some of the world's top musicians and singers have performed in this arena :

On 16 November 2019, Dua Lipa and Katy Perry headlined the One Plus Music Festival. This was Katy Perry's first time performing in India since 2012.

In September 2019, U2 announced a concert in the stadium on 15 December, as part of The Joshua Tree Tour 2019. It was a sold-out show in front of over 42,000 spectators at their first concert in India.

In December 2017, the World's Biggest Guestlist Festival, 2-day event was held, organised by Shailendra Singh and Guestlist4Good, with Hardwell, W&W, Nucleya, Adnan Sami, Shaan, Mithoon, KillTheBuzz, Suyano, Aditi Singh Sharma, Armaan Malik performing. 75,000 fans were in attendance on the second day, United we Are by Hardwell, and the event supported the education of 100,000 underprivileged Indian children through Magic Bus. 

In May 2017, Justin Bieber played to a crowd of 56,000 at the stadium as a part of the Purpose Tour which was the first time that he had performed in India. 

In December 2015, Hardwell was invited by Shailendra Singh to perform for the World's Biggest Guestlist event at the venue, waiving his personal appearance fee in favour of donating all of the proceeds to charity. For the record-setting show, Guestlist4Good opened 75,000 spots on Hardwell's personal guestlist for over 125,000 pre-registered fans, while also accepting pledges and donations with the goal of providing educational aid for 2,800 children as they age from 8 to 18.

In May 2013, a grand musical concert 'Nhau Tujhiya Preme' (Bathing in Shower of Your Love) was held at the stadium. It was a spiritual musical event wherein around 50 abhyanga (spiritual poetries) were sung and attended by around 35000 devotees from various regions across the world.

World record 
The Guinness Book of Records lists the "Largest health awareness lesson (single venue)" as 51,861 participants, achieved by Dr. Shri Nanasaheb Dharmadhikari Pratishthan (India) at the stadium on 20 December 2013.

See also
List of stadiums by capacity
List of association football stadiums by capacity
List of cricket grounds by capacity

References

External links
D. Y. Patil Sports Academy

Sports venues in Navi Mumbai
Cricket grounds in Maharashtra
Tennis venues in India
Sports venues completed in 2008
Indian Super League stadiums
2017 FIFA U-17 World Cup venues
2008 establishments in Maharashtra